Bill Dodgin may refer to:

 Bill Dodgin Sr. (1909–1999), footballer and manager of Southampton, Brentford, Bristol Rovers and Fulham, 1949–1953
 Bill Dodgin Jr. (1931–2000), his son, footballer for Arsenal and manager of QPR and Fulham, 1969–1972